Leucoptera periphracta is a moth in the Lyonetiidae family that is endemic to Australia.

They probably mine the leaves of their host plant.

External links

Leucoptera (moth)
Moths described in 1915
Endemic fauna of Australia
Moths of Australia